Johnson State College was a public liberal arts college in Johnson, Vermont. Founded in 1828 by John Chesamore, in 2018 it was merged with the former Lyndon State College to create Northern Vermont University.

History and governance 

Both the college, and the town of Johnson are named for William Samuel Johnson (1727-1819), American jurist, statesman and educator.  The town of Johnson, and a part of neighboring Cambridge, Vermont together once made up the King's College Tract, a land grant chartered by King George III in 1774 for the eventual expansion of King's College in New York, today's Columbia University.  Following the Declaration of Independence, and the emergence of the Vermont Republic, the town was instead granted to William Samuel Johnson by Vermont's Council of Censors in 1782. Johnson represented Connecticut in the Continental Congress, and argued for Vermont's admission to the federal Union.  He later became president of Columbia University. John Chesamore founded Johnson State College as Johnson Academy, a grammar school instructing students in Greek, Latin, algebra and geometry.  In 1867 the school became a Vermont state "normal school", a term based on the French école normale – a school to educate teachers.  Early on Johnson embraced the ideas of learning from experience, and the role of the student in directing some part of their curriculum.  The college was among the first Vermont universities to introduce electives.  Through the early to mid-twentieth century Johnson emerged as a college of the liberal arts and natural sciences.

A commitment to educating the whole student in an interdisciplinary manner, begun in the 1920s and 1930s, set in place a history of bringing visiting poets, playwrights, politicians, and artists to the college.  That tradition continues, bringing filmmakers, political and spiritual leaders, and artists.  Recent visitors to the campus include Japanese and Cuban drummers, New Orleans jazz musicians, and Buddhist monks who installed an environmental art work at Lower Pond.

The original campus was built in the village of Johnson and over time, the college expanded; slowly building higher upon what is now called College Hill, finally settling upon a plateau above the village with a view of Sterling Mountain and the Sterling Mountain Range.  Today the college is a part of the Vermont State Colleges, a consortium of five colleges governed by a common board of trustees, chancellor, and Council of Presidents, each college with its own president and deans.

On July 1, 2018, Johnson State College and Lyndon State College were merged, creating Northern Vermont University.

Athletics 
Johnson State College teams participated as a member of the National Collegiate Athletic Association's Division III. The Badgers were a member of the North Atlantic Conference (NAC). Men's sports included basketball, cross country, golf, lacrosse, soccer, tennis, track & field, and volleyball; while women's sports included basketball, cross country, soccer, softball, tennis, track & field and volleyball. In 2018, women's triathlon was added to the varsity sports roster, representing the only NCAA institution in New England to carry women's triathlon as a varsity sport.

Philosophy and academic programs

Education by engagement 
Johnson emphasizes the self-development of undergraduate students with what the college terms "education by engagement".  The student is engaged not solely on her or his degree program, but as an adult citizen with emphasis on their place in, and contribution to, their society, nation, and world.  After a year of interdisciplinary study, students file a Plan of Study during the sophomore year.  This becomes a guiding yet flexible road map for completion of students' degree work.  Degree programs include the natural sciences, business, fine and performing arts, education, mathematics, literature, health sciences, writing and literature, and hospitality and tourism management.  Precepts of Vermont educator-philosopher John Dewey (1859-1952) inform Johnson's emphasis on students' self evolution with emphasis on "learning by doing" and "learning by teaching".  The college emphasizes the individual's civic contribution to their larger society.

Faculty and students 
The college has a faculty-student ratio of 1:14. Ninety-one percent of the college's faculty hold a Ph.D. or equivalent doctorate level terminal degree in their area of instruction.  Nearly 60% of undergraduate students come from Vermont, with approximately 40% coming from other U.S. states and more than a dozen nations.

Graduate programs at Johnson include an M.F.A. in Studio Arts, a Master of Arts in Education, and Master of Arts in Counseling. Parts of these programs can be completed with a low residency requirement. Portions of the  M.F.A. in Studio Arts program includes course work in conjunction with the Vermont Studio Center, located in the village of Johnson.

Facilities

The Dibden Center for the Arts
Named for Arthur J. Dibden, president of Johnson State College 1967-69, Dibden oversaw the expansion and development of the fine and performing arts programs. The center is located on the southwest side of the campus and houses the college's Dance, Music, and Theater programs as well as gallery exhibition space for the Fine Arts programs. The striking late modernist building, whose sculptural roofline echoes the contours of the Sterling Mountain Range–its backdrop to the south, is the work of architect Robert Burley. Burley apprenticed in the studio of Eero Saarinen. The large 500-seat Dibden Theater with  a 44' proscenium stage is the centerpiece of the performing arts facilities at the center. Excellent acoustics are achieved by a system of hardwood baffles along the walls and ceilings. Practice and instruction rooms wrap around the theater and the Julian Scott Memorial Gallery on the front of the center showcases exhibitions of fine art and design by the college's fine art students as well as travelling exhibitions and the work of visiting artists. The Dibden Center for the Arts houses the faculties of the Department of Music and the Department of Theater, a recording studio, music studios, practice rooms, classrooms and a piano laboratory. Recitals and concerts, theater and contemporary dance performances, and open rehearsals bring performing arts into the daily life of the college. The Vermont Symphony Orchestra performs regularly at the center. Several performing arts series available to the college community, are also available to the public by subscription. The Dibden Center is an important fine and performing arts venue for all of Vermont. One of the best aspects of Dibden is the fact that it is fully student run, both working Front of House and backstage, so there is always learning and working opportunity for students that seek work opportunities and those who would like to learn more about the theater.

Library and Learning Center
Johnson's Library and Learning Center (LLC) opened in 1996 and incorporates the collections of the older John Dewey Library with expanded collections and new technology. The print collection includes 130,000+ volumes and over 700 journals and periodicals. The LLC houses the largest collections of fine arts publications in Vermont and is a designated National Archives and Records Administration repository. The contemporary, green design building makes use of passive and active solar heating. Its south-southwest orintetation for reading rooms utilizes natural light. The LLC is built of terra cotta brick, Vermont gray granite, Vermont blue-gray slate, steel, and green-tinted glass. The LLC was designed by the architectural firm of Gossens Bachman Architects and has won numerous awards for its architecture and environmental efficiency. Awards include the 1997 American Institute of Architects (AIA) Vermont "Excellence in Architecture Award". The LLC also houses the faculties of the Department of Humanities, and the Department of Writing and Literature. A skybrige links the LLC with Wilson Bentley Hall. The LLC has become a community centerpiece and serves as a gateway to the northwest side of the quadrangle. An informal outdoor amphitheater facing the quadrangle has become a popular outdoor social area in warmer weather.

John Dewey Hall 
John Dewey Hall on the south side of the quadrangle was built in 1963 in the International Style; to house the college's library. It is named for the philosopher and educator John Dewey. The building is lit by natural light from a  panoramic glass clerestory around the perimeter of the building. Today the building houses the college bookstore, the office of the dean of students, the Student Association, the Registration and Advising Center, TRIO, academic advising, and career & internship offices.

Visual Arts Center
Johnson's Visual Arts Center (VAC) houses the college's Visual Arts Programs, which was renovated in 2012, with studios for design, drawing, painting, printmaking, photography, sculpture, ceramics and woodworking. The Digital Imaging Laboratory (DIL) is also located here with state-of-the-art oversized high-resolution laser CMYK and Inkjet printers. The VAC augments exhibition space at the Julian Scott Memorial Gallery in the Dibden Center with a gallery for exhibiting works in progress and student projects. Exhibitions play a major role in both academic and student life at Johnson. Students have opportunities to show their work beginning in their freshman year. Exhibition programs support and expand the studio curriculum, providing students with frequent opportunities to share their work and receive input; and, by exhibiting faculty and visiting artists' work, providing insights into teachers’ approaches to making art and critique. Exhibitions in many mediums both of work produced within the college, and by work exhibited by visiting artists exposes students to a wide range of contemporary thinking and art-making methods. Fine arts majors in the freshman and sophomore levels most commonly exhibit work in the VAC. Students in their junior and senior years, especially those presenting thesis level work exhibit in the Julian Scott Memorial Gallery at the Dibden Center for the Arts.

Wilson Bentley Science Hall
Named for the scientist-artist, Wilson Bentley (1865–1931) who first photographed snowflakes in the nineteenth century in nearby Jericho, Vermont. Bentley brought an objective scientific eye to the examination of snow and ice crystals via hugely magnified images called photomicrographs. Bentley published a monograph titled Snow Crystals which documented more than 2000 snowflakes and ice crystals. Wilson Bentley Hall, designed by noted architect Robert Burley, houses the faculties of the Department of Mathematics, and the Department of Environmental and Health Sciences. A 200-seat lecture hall with digital projection facilities, an interactive television studio, and laboratories for biology, chemistry, physical sciences, cartography, and geographic information systems. Bentley Hall also houses a state-of-the-art interactive multimedia computer laboratory and is a designated National Science Foundation research facility. The building also houses a meteorological station, and green house.

The Babcock Nature Preserve
The Babcock Nature Preserve, located ten miles from Johnson in Eden, Vermont is a 1,000 acre (4 km²) tract of forest land owned and maintained by the college for scientific and educational study. A large, environmentally significant bog, and three large ponds dominate the physical landscape. The Babcock Nature Preserve is a natural laboratory for field biology, ornithology and environmental sciences courses. The summer field program at the Babcock Nature Preserve features a number of intensive courses designed to provide field experience in the environmental and natural sciences.

Notable alumni 
 Susan Bartlett, former member of the Vermont Senate from the Lamoille district
Vernon A. Bullard, United States Attorney for the District of Vermont
 Jim DeRose, head coach of the Bradley Braves men’s soccer team
 Charles Clark Jamieson, U.S. Army brigadier general
 Gregory C. Knight, adjutant general of the Vermont National Guard beginning in March 2019
 Cyndi Lauper, singer, songwriter, actress and LGBT rights activist
 Raymond J. McNulty, Dean of the School of Education at Southern New Hampshire University
 Walter Mosley, crime fiction novelist
 Anthony Pollina, member of the Vermont Senate from the Washington district
 Julian Scott, Union Army drummer during the American Civil War, recipient of the Medal of Honor
 Caroline S. Woodruff, educator, president of Castleton University, president of National Education Foundation

See also 
 List of colleges and universities in the United States
 List of colleges and universities in Vermont

References

Sources 
 Bentley, Wilson A. and W. J. Humphreys. Snow Crystals. McGraw Hill Book Company: 1931, Dover reprint edition: 1962. .
 Dewey, John. Experience and Education. Free Press, reprint edition: 1997. .
 Dewey, John. Democracy and Education. Free Press, reprint edition: 1997. .
 Graff, Nancy Price. Visible Layers of Time: A Perspective on the History and Architecture of Johnson, Vermont. The University of Vermont, Historic Preservation Program: 1990. 
 Raymond, Kenneth. The History of Johnson State College: 1828-1984. Johnson State College: 1985.
 Mantell, Suzanne. Vermont: Art of the State. Henry N. Abrams, Inc., Publishers: 1998  
 Swift, Esther Monroe. Vermont Place Names: Footprints of History. The Stephen Greene Press: 1996 .
 Bulletin of Johnson State College, 1974/'05, 1976/'07.
 Johnson Views. 2003, 2004, 2005.
 Vermont Life. Fall 1971.

External links 

 

 
Defunct universities and colleges in Vermont
Liberal arts colleges in Vermont
Educational institutions established in 1828
1828 establishments in Vermont
Vermont State Colleges
Buildings and structures in Lamoille County, Vermont
Education in Lamoille County, Vermont
Tourist attractions in Lamoille County, Vermont
Johnson, Vermont
Public liberal arts colleges in the United States
Educational institutions disestablished in 2018
2018 disestablishments in Vermont